Merry-Go-Round was a national clothing retail chain owned by Merry-Go-Round Enterprises, Inc., that thrived from the 1970s through the early 1990s. The chain fell into bankruptcy during the mid-1990s, and eventually ceased operation in 1996. It was famous for its ability to profit from short-lived fashion fads and also owned men's clothing retailers Silverman's, by purchasing 273 stores from Retail Ventures, Inc. (RVI), parent of American Eagle Outfitters, in 1989. In May 1993, it purchased the Chess King clothing chain from the Melville Corporation. It filed for Chapter 11 bankruptcy in 1994 and began liquidation sales by February 1996. At its end, the company operated just over 500 locations, primarily in enclosed malls.

Their mid-1980s commercials parodied Quiet Riot's "Cum On Feel the Noize", with teens and young adults walking down a hallway with massive sized speakers blaring the song.

Merry-Go-Round's unsuccessful reorganization led to the 1998 lawsuit Devan v. Ernst and Young against Ernst and Young for violating the standard of care as turnaround advisor. The case resulted in the largest single defendant settlement in Maryland history.

In 2011, MainStreet.com listed Merry-Go-Round among brand names "gone but not forgotten".

References

External links

Defunct retail companies of the United States
Defunct companies based in Maryland
1996 disestablishments in Maryland
Retail companies disestablished in 1996
Companies that filed for Chapter 11 bankruptcy in 1994